"Sour Candy" is a song by Canadian singer/songwriter Carly Rae Jepsen, released in October 2009 as the fourth and final single from her debut studio album, Tug of War. The song was written by Jepsen and Marianas Trench lead vocalist Josh Ramsay, who also produced the song and is featured as a vocalist on the single version. It failed to chart on the Canadian Hot 100, but did enter the Canada Hot AC airplay chart monitored by Nielsen BDS Radio.

Content
This song discusses the loss of a relationship, which Jepsen refers to as a "sour candy ending." The main instrument used is acoustic guitar.

Music video
The music video for "Sour Candy" was shot in Vancouver, BC and directed by Ben Knechtel. It premiered 16 December 2009 and was uploaded to Jepsen's Vevo channel on 5 July 2011. It tells the story of two estranged lovers (played by Jepsen and Ramsay) in couple's therapy.

Chart performance

References

2008 songs
2009 singles
Carly Rae Jepsen songs
Songs written by Carly Rae Jepsen
Songs written by Josh Ramsay